Caeli enarrant... (Latin for "The Heavens declare...", the first words from Psalm 19) is the name given to a large-scale cycle of musical works by composer Georges Lentz (born 1965). Parts II and VI of the cycle are as yet unpublished. Part VII ('Mysterium') is still in progress.

Compositions by Georges Lentz